Thidwick the Big-Hearted Moose is a 1948 children's book by Dr. Seuss.

Summary
Thidwick, a moose in a herd numbering approximately sixty who subsist mainly on moose-moss and live on the northern shore of Lake Winna-Bango, grants a small bug's request to ride on his antlers (mistakenly referred to in the book as horns) free of charge. The bug takes advantage of the moose's kindness and settles in as a permanent resident, inviting various other animals to live on and in the moose's antlers.

The kind-hearted moose acquiesces to the unexpected living arrangements, treating the animals as 'guests' even though he never told them explicitly that they were allowed to live there. His passengers however are thoughtless and selfish, and the situation quickly gets out of control. When one of the guests, a woodpecker, begins drilling holes in Thidwick's antlers, the other moose give Thidwick an ultimatum: if he doesn't get rid of his guests then he will be forced to leave the herd.

When Thidwick's sense of decency compels him to forgo the comforts of herd life in favor of indulging his guests, his herd leaves him behind. Winter comes, and the herd swims across the lake to find fresh supplies of moose-moss. Thidwick wants to do the same, but his guests object, and insist that Thidwick must not take "their home to the far distant side of the lake". Even as he faces starvation, Thidwick refuses to go against his guests' wishes, and he remains on the cold, northern shore of the lake, where his guests prefer to reside. Meanwhile, the heartless residents of Thidwick's antlers, who pay no regard to the increasing physical or psychological load that the moose is forced to endure, continue inviting other animals, including a  black bear, to live with them.

The situation comes to a head when a group of hunters spot Thidwick and pursue him, with the goal of shooting him and mounting his head on the wall of the Harvard Club of New York: a building well known in the 1930s and 1940s for its hunting trophies. Thidwick attempts to outrun the hunters, but the heavy load, including his passengers' refusal to permit him to travel across the lake, prevents him from escaping. Just before his capture, however, Thidwick remembers that it is time for him to shed his antlers. At the last moment, he drops his antlers, makes a snide comment to his former guests, and escapes by swimming across the lake to rejoin his herd. His former guests are captured by the hunters and are stuffed and mounted, still perched on his antlers, on the trophy wall of the Harvard Club.

Meaning
The story explores the limits of hospitality and sharing. Neil Reynolds has discussed it as a parable of immigration issues and the social welfare state.
Aeon J. Skoble discusses Thidwick at length as an exemplification of the idea of property rights, and particularly of John Locke's formulation of property rights.
Skoble argues that Thidwick is badly mistaken in viewing the other animals as "guests", and that the story demonstrates this. In a later essay in the same volume, Henry Cribbs makes a similar point, considering whether "Thidwick" is a case of squatter's rights. According to critic David Dempsey: "A man of less consistency than Seuss would have let Thidwick be rescued by the creatures he is befriending ... but Seuss' logic is rooted in principle, rather than sentiment, and the sponging animals get what they deserve. Incidentally, this is also what the child expects".

Adaptations
 Welcome, a 1986 Soviet animated film
 Thidwick the Big-Hearted Moose, a 1992 direct-to-video short following Horton Hears a Who!
 Thidwick the Big-Hearted Moose, an upcoming animated special set for release on Netflix.

References

External links

 Thidwick the Big-Hearted Moose at Seuss Dude
 Thidwick, the Big-hearted Moose at Google Books

1948 children's books
American picture books
Children's fiction books
Books by Dr. Seuss
Fictional deer and moose
Children's books adapted into films
Random House books
Starvation